Michael Culver (born 16 June 1938) is an English actor. He was born in Hampstead, London, the son of actor Roland Culver and casting director Daphne Rye. He was educated at Gresham's School.

Actor 
Culver's aunt, father, mother and brother all had theatrical careers. Culver gained experience at the Old Vic, Dundee Rep (performing in 35 plays in 2 years) and London Academy of Music and Dramatic Art.

Culver has appeared in several television series in recurring roles, as Squire Armstrong in The Adventures of Black Beauty (1972–74), Major Erwin Brandt in the BBC drama Secret Army (1977–78), crooked banker Ralph Saroyan in the second series of The House of Eliott (1992) and the strict Prior Robert ('Brother Prior') in Cadfael (1994–98).

His guest roles include an episode of The Sweeney as Dave Leeford (episode Money, Money, Money; 1978), The Professionals (1982) as Lawson, Miss Marple "The Moving Finger" (1985) as Edward Symmington and as Sir Reginald Musgrave, in the episode "The Musgrave Ritual" (1986) in the Granada Television series The Return of Sherlock Holmes.

Culver has appeared in two uncredited roles in James Bond films. In From Russia With Love (1963), he played a man in a punt which was followed as the co-pilot of Avro Vulcan, (Callsign Ramjet MBX-79), in Thunderball (1965). Other film roles are Captain Needa in The Empire Strikes Back (1980) and also a major part in A Passage to India (1984) as a bigoted police inspector. In 2008, he appeared in a guest role in Sidetracked, the first episode of Wallander. Culver was in the first ever episode of New Tricks in 2003 as a corrupt dinosaur detective.

He performed in three of Tricycle Theatre’s Tribunal Plays: Nuremberg (A distillation of the 1945–46 Nuremberg trials – of leading Nazi war criminals); Half the Picture (From transcripts from the Scott Inquiry into Arms-to-Iraq – the first play to be performed in the Palace of Westminster.) and The Colour of Justice (The dramatisation of the evidence given during Sir William Macpherson’s inquiry into the murder of Stephen Lawrence, his family's search for justice and endemic racism in the police force). They were directed by Nicolas Kent. The Colour of Justice and Half the Picture and were broadcast by the BBC Television.

Theatre

With Dundee Repertory Theatre 1959–1961
 The Curious Savage by John Patrick Directed by Anthony Page.
In Search of Happiness by Victor Rozov Translated by Nina Froud. Directed by Anthony Page.
Fools Rush In by Kenneth Horne, Directed by Anthony Page.
A Streetcar Named Desire by Tennessee Williams. Directed by Anthony Page.
Tomorrow's Child by John Coates.
Great Expectations by Charles Dickens.
The Cat and the Canary by John Willard, Directed by Anthony Page Designer: Chris J. Arthur.
The Critic and the Heart by Robert Bolt. Directed by Anthony Page.
See How They Run by Philip King. Directed by Anthony Page Designer: Philip King.
Born Yesterday by Garson Kanin. Directed by Anthony Page Designer: Peter Gray.
Death of a Salesman by Arthur Miller.. Directed by Anthony Page Edward Furby.
Five Finger Exercise by Peter Shaffer. Directed by Anthony Page.
Roar Like a Dove by Lesley Storm. Directed by Lesley Storm.
The Blind Madonna by Neil Curnow Directed by Raymond Westwell.
Eighty in the shade by Clemence Dane. Directed by Raymond Westwell
Dear Brutus by Sir James Matthew Barrie. Performance marking the centenary year of playwright J.M. Barrie's birth. Directed by Raymond Westwell.
Any Other Business by Campbell Singer Directed by Anthony Page.
Lucky Strike by Michael Brett.
Caught Napping by Geoffrey Lumsden. Directedy Raymond Westwell.
Summer of the Seventeenth Doll by Ray Lawler. Directed by Raymond Westwell.
Gilt and Gingerbread by Lionel Hale. Directed by Raymond Westwell.
I Have Been Here Before by J. B. Priestley. Directed by Raymond Westwell.
Murder on Arrival by George Batson. Directed by Raymond Westwell.
Sinbad the Sailor by James Grout and Ken Wynne, Directed by Raymond Westwell.
The Importance of Being Earnest by Oscar Wilde. Directed by Raymond Westwell.
Brothers in Law by Ted Willis and Henry Cecil. Directed by Raymond Westwell
Present Laughter by Sir Noël Coward Directed by Raymond Westwell.
The Long and the Short and the Tall by Willis Hall. Directed by Raymond Westwell.
The Manor of Northstead by William Douglas-Home. Directed by Raymond Westwell.
Love in a Mist by Kenneth Horne Directed by Mary Evans and James Ward.
Not in the Book by Arthur Watkyn. Directed by Raymond Westwell.
The Vanity Case by Jack Popplewell. Directed by Raymond Westwell.
Charley's Aunt by Brandon Thomas. Directed by Raymond Westwell.
Love from a Stranger by Agatha Christie adapted by Frank Vosper. Directed by Anthony Page.
The Durable Element by Cliff Hanley. Directed by John Crockett.

Shakespeare At the Old Vic
Directed by Michael Benthall 
 The Famous History of the Life of King Henry VIII
 The Tragedy of King Lear
 Midsummer Night’s Dream
 The Tragedy of Hamlet, Prince of Denmark (fights arranged by Bernard Hepton).
 King Henry VI
 Twelfth Night
 The Sleeping Prince by Terence Rattigan The Stratham Hill Theatre, 1956. Directed by Anthony Knowles.

London and West End
Judith by Jean Giraudoux, adapted by Christopher Fry, Her Majesty's Theatre, Haymarket and Theatre Royal, Brighton, 1962. Directed by Harold Clurman.
The Master Builder by Henrik Ibsen, Translated by Michael Meyer, The New Arts Theatre Club, 1962. Directed by Terence Kilburn. Michael Culver played Ragnar Brovik. The cast included: Keith Pyott, Andrew Cruickshank, Viola Keats and Mary Miller.
Alexander in A Severed Head, Criterion Theatre, 1963, by Iris Murdoch and J. B. Priestley, Directed by Val May.

Tricycle Theatre
Gore-Booth and Sir Nicholas Lyell in Half the Picture, adapted by Richard Norton-Taylor With additional material by John McGrath; Tricycle Theatre, 1994. Directed by Nicholas Kent. This was the first play to be performed in the Palace of Westminster. 
Ragnar Brovik in The Master Builder by Henrik Ibsen, Translated by Michael Meyer, The New Arts Theatre Club, 1962. Directed by Terence Kilburn.  
Albert Speer in Nuremberg Transcripts edited by: Richard Norton-Taylor; Tricycle Theatre, 1996. Directed by Nicholas Kent.
Sir William Macpherson in The Colour of Justice, edited by Richard Norton-Taylor, transferred to the Lyttelton Theatre and toured the UK, 1999. Directed by Nicolas Kent assisted by Surian Fletcher-Jones, it won Best Touring Production in Theatrical Management Association Awards. 
Fashion by Doug Lucie; Haymarket Theatre, Leicester, transferred from to the Tricycle Theatre 1989–1990.

Touring productions
Wickham in Pride and Prejudice from the novel by Jane Austen; toured 1966. Produced/Directed by Sheila Hancock.
Rosmersholm by Henrik Ibsen (Hong Kong)
Blithe Spirit by Noël Coward. (1988 – toured Norway and Sweden)

Other
Ellis Petersen in A Share in the Sun by Terence Kelly and Campbell Singer, New Theatre, Oxford and Cambridge Theatre, 1966. Directed by Harold French.
Peter Quilpe in The Cocktail Party by T. S. Eliot, Theatre Royal, Windsor, 1966. Directed by Neville Jason.
Charles in Howards End adapted by Lance Sieveking in collaboration with Richard Cottrell from the novel by E. M. Forster; toured 1967. Directed by Dacre Punt.
Mike Danbury in Anything For Baby by Talbot Rothwell and William Meyer; Wimbledon Theatre, 1969. Directed by Patrick Cargill
The Earl of Harpenden in While the Sun Shines by Terence Rattigan; Hampstead Theatre Club, 1972. Directed by Alec McCowen
Young Macduff in Macbeth by William Shakespeare Haymarket Theatre, Leicester, 1978. Directed by John Tydeman.
Lord Goring in An Ideal Husband by Oscar Wilde, at the Theatre Royal, Windsor, Berkshire, 1979 (the 1295th Production). Directed by Joan Riley
Roald Amundsen in Terra Nova by Ted Tally; Watford Palace Theatre, 1982. Directed by Michael Attenborough
Hugo in The Little Heroine by Nell Dunn; Nuffield Theatre, University of Southampton, 1988. Directed by Ian Watt-Smith.  
Time and the Conways by J. B. Priestley, Royal Exchange, Manchester 
Two Plays for Gaza, 2009 (Seven Jewish Children by Caryl Churchill and The Trainer by David Wilson & Anne Aylor at the Hackney Empire

Radio and voice work
The Burning Glass by Jo Anderson and Directed Andy Jordan.
"Breizh has a problem. The World Cup looms and all eyes are on FRANCE. Down on the estate, something stirs."
Others in the cast: Philip Madoc and Frances Jeater. BBC Radio 4 Saturday Play 30 May 1998 repeated 20 March 1990
Rachmaninoff Presented by Melvyn Bragg
Michael Culver voiced Rachmaninoff. Other contributions from Vladimir Ashkenazy (speaker and piano), Jonathan Kydd (Yermakov voice over), Boris Berezovskii (piano), Shura Cherkassky (piano), Mikhail Falkov (tenor), Alexander Fedin (tenor), Joan Rodgers (soprano). With Royal Philharmonic Orchestra and Philharmonia Chorus.
Fatherland by Robert Harris. Adapted and Directed by John Dryden
Cast included Anton Lesser (Xavier March), Graham Padden (Krause), Robert Portal (Jost), Peter Ellis (Max Jarger), Thomas Copeland (Pili), Andrew Sachs, Amanda Walker, Patrick Godfrey, Michael Byrne, Ian Gelder, Angeline Ball, William Scott Masson, Stratford Johns, Eleanor Bron, Dan Fineman, Alice Arnold and Trevor Nichols, with Ned Sherrin, Jonathan Coleman and Alan Dedicoat. Goldhawk Radio production. Broadcast BBC Radio 4, 9 June 1997
Flight of the Swan by Jean MacVean. BBC Radio 4, 7 August 1982
Cast included: Rosalind Shanks and David Neal
The play deals with human love and how it is so often impossible for one person to really know another.
Wilderness of Mirrors Unabridged 1989 reading of the novel by Ted Allbeury

Filmography

Film

Television

1961–1970

1971–1980

1981–1990

1991–2000

2001–2010

2011–present

Documentary

References

External links

 Michael Culver BFI
Freedomlite, his own site: "genocidal jottings, mainly in the form of poems, are dedicated to the children of Kosovo, Iraq and Afghanistan"

1938 births
English male film actors
English male television actors
Living people
People from Hampstead
20th-century English male actors
English male stage actors
English male radio actors
People educated at Gresham's School